The following is a timeline of major events leading up to, during, and after the 2016 United States presidential election. The election was the 58th quadrennial United States presidential election, held on November 8, 2016. The presidential primaries and caucuses were held between February 1 and June 14, 2016, staggered among the 50 states, Washington, D.C., and U.S. territories. The U.S. Congress certified the electoral result on January 6, 2017, and the new President and Vice President were inaugurated on January 20, 2017.

2014

November 2014
 November 20 – Jim Webb, former US Senator from Virginia, forms an exploratory committee for a possible run for president

December 2014
 December 16 – Former Florida Governor Jeb Bush announces the formation of a political action committee (PAC) for a possible run for president

2015

January 2015
 January 26 – Chris Christie, Governor of New Jersey, forms a PAC in preparation for a possible run for president
 January 27 – Martin O'Malley, former Governor of Maryland, forms a PAC in preparation for a possible run for president
 January 29 –  Lindsey Graham, United States Senator from South Carolina, forms an exploratory committee in preparation for a possible run for president
 January 30 – Mitt Romney, former Governor of Massachusetts and 2012 Republican presidential nominee, declines to run in the 2016 election after considering it

February 2015 
 February 9 – George Pataki, former Governor of New York, forms a PAC in preparation for a possible run for president

March 2015 
 March 2 – Ben Carson, a retired neurosurgeon, forms an exploratory committee in preparation for a possible run for president
 March 5 – Mark Everson, former Commissioner of Internal Revenue, formally announces his candidacy for the presidential nomination of the Republican Party
 March 18 – Donald Trump, CEO of The Trump Organization since 1971, forms an exploratory committee in preparation for a possible run for president on the Republican Party ticket
 March 23 – U.S. Senator Ted Cruz, of Texas, formally announces his candidacy for the presidential nomination of the Republican Party

April 2015 
 April 7 – U.S. Senator Rand Paul, of Kentucky, officially declares his candidacy for the presidential nomination of the Republican Party
 April 9
 Former Rhode Island Governor Lincoln Chafee announces the formation of an exploratory committee for a possible run for president 
 Former U.S. Senator Rick Santorum of Pennsylvania forms a "testing the waters" account for a possible run for president
 April 12 – Former Secretary of State Hillary Clinton formally announces her candidacy for the presidential nomination of the Democratic Party
 April 13 – U.S. Senator Marco Rubio, of Florida, officially declares his candidacy for the presidential nomination of the Republican Party
 April 30 – U.S. Senator Bernie Sanders, of Vermont, formally announces his candidacy for the presidential nomination of the Democratic Party

May 2015 
 May 4
 Former business executive Carly Fiorina, of California officially declares her candidacy for the presidential nomination of the Republican Party
 Neurosurgeon Ben Carson, of Maryland, formally announces his candidacy for the presidential nomination of the Republican Party
 May 5 – Former Governor of Arkansas Mike Huckabee officially declares his candidacy for the presidential nomination of the Republican Party
 May 27 – Former U.S. Senator Rick Santorum, of Pennsylvania, formally announces his candidacy for the presidential nomination of the Republican Party
 May 28 – Former Governor of New York George Pataki officially declares his candidacy for the presidential nomination of the Republican Party
 May 30 – Former Governor of Maryland Martin O'Malley formally announces his candidacy for the presidential nomination of the Democratic Party
 May 31 – US Senator Elizabeth Warren of Massachusetts confirms she will not be running for president

June 2015 
 June 1 – U.S. Senator Lindsey Graham, of South Carolina, officially declares his candidacy for the presidential nomination of the Republican Party
 June 3 – Former Governor of Rhode Island Lincoln Chafee formally announces his candidacy for the presidential nomination of the Democratic Party
 June 4 – Former Governor of Texas Rick Perry officially declares his candidacy for the presidential nomination of the Republican Party
 June 15 – Former Governor of Florida Jeb Bush formally announces his candidacy for the presidential nomination of the Republican Party
 June 16 – Business magnate Donald Trump, of New York, officially declares his candidacy for the presidential nomination of the Republican Party
 June 22 – Massachusetts physician Jill Stein officially declares her candidacy for the presidential nomination of the Green Party
 June 24 – Governor of Louisiana Bobby Jindal formally announces his candidacy for the presidential nomination of the Republican Party
 June 30 – Governor of New Jersey Chris Christie officially declares his candidacy for the presidential nomination of the Republican Party

July 2015 
 July 2 – Former U.S. Senator Jim Webb, of Virginia, formally announces his candidacy for the presidential nomination of the Democratic Party
 July 13 – Governor of Wisconsin Scott Walker formally announces his candidacy for the presidential nomination of the Republican Party
 July 21   – Governor of Ohio John Kasich officially announces his candidacy for the presidential nomination of the Republican Party
 July 30  – Former Governor of Virginia Jim Gilmore formally announces his candidacy for the presidential nomination of the Republican Party

August 2015 
 August 3 – First presidential forum, featuring 14 Republican candidates, was broadcast on C-SPAN from the New Hampshire Institute of Politics in Goffstown, New Hampshire
 August 4 – Fox News announced which 10 candidates were invited to the first official Republican debate
 August 6 – First official presidential debate, featuring 10 Republican candidates, is held in Cleveland, Ohio Fox News includes the other seven Republican candidates in a separate debate held earlier on the same day
 August 11 – Lawrence Lessig forms an exploratory committee for a possible run for president, stating that if he raised $1 million by Labor Day he would run 
 August 16 – Andy Martin formally announces his candidacy for the presidential nomination of the Republican Party
 August 22 – Jimmy McMillan formally announces his candidacy for the presidential nomination of the Republican Party

September 2015 
 September 6 – Lawrence Lessig, Harvard University law professor, formally announces his candidacy for the Democratic presidential nomination
 September 8 – John McAfee, antivirus software developer, formally announces his candidacy for president under the banner of the newly formed Cyber Party
 September 11  – Rick Perry formally withdraws his candidacy for the Republican presidential nomination
 September 16  – Second Republican debate is held in Simi Valley, California
 September 21 – Scott Walker formally withdraws his candidacy for the Republican presidential nomination
 September 30 – South Carolina finalizes ballot for primary; 15 Republican candidates qualify

October 2015 
 October 13 – First Democratic debate is held in Las Vegas, Nevada at the Wynn Casino
 October 16 – Lawrence Lessig announces he is dropping his much-derided promise to resign after passing his signature legislation. He stated he would to serve a full term as president and would flesh out his policy agenda accordingly
 October 20 – Jim Webb formally withdraws his candidacy for the Democratic presidential nomination
 October 21 – Vice President Joe Biden announces that he will not run for president in 2016
 October 23 – Lincoln Chafee formally withdraws his candidacy for the Democratic presidential nomination
 October 28 – Third Republican debate is held in Boulder, Colorado at the University of Colorado

November 2015 
 November 2 – Lawrence Lessig formally withdraws his candidacy for the Democratic presidential nomination
 November 4–20 – Candidate registration for New Hampshire primary
 November 5 – Mark Everson formally withdraws his candidacy for the Republican presidential nomination
 November 6
 Deadline for filing for the Alabama primary
 First in the South Democratic Forum featuring Martin O'Malley, Bernie Sanders, and Hillary Clinton is broadcast on MSNBC from Winthrop University in Rock Hill, South Carolina
 November 9 – Deadline for filing for the Arkansas primary 
 November 10 – Fourth Republican debate is held in Milwaukee, Wisconsin 
 November 13–14 – Republican Party of Florida's Sunshine Summit event is held in Orlando, Florida 
 November 14 – Second Democratic debate is held in Des Moines, Iowa
 November 17 – Bobby Jindal formally withdraws his candidacy for the Republican presidential nomination
 November 20 – The Presidential Family Forum is held in Des Moines, Iowa
 November 24 – MoveOn.org Democratic forum featuring Martin O'Malley and Bernie Sanders

December 2015 
 December 3 – The Republican Jewish Coalition Presidential Candidates Forum is held in Washington, D.C.
 December 9 – Jimmy McMillan formally withdraws his candidacy for the Republican presidential nomination
 December 15  – Fifth Republican debate is held in Las Vegas, Nevada
 December 19 – Third Democratic debate is held in Manchester, New Hampshire
 December 21 – Lindsey Graham formally withdraws his candidacy for the Republican presidential nomination
 December 24 – John McAfee, antivirus software developer, formally announces his candidacy for the Libertarian presidential nomination
 December 29 – George Pataki formally withdraws his candidacy for the Republican presidential nomination

2016

January 2016 
 January 6 – Former Governor of New Mexico Gary Johnson formally announces his candidacy for the presidential nomination of the Libertarian Party
 January 9 – The Republicans' Kemp Forum is held in Columbia, South Carolina
 January 11 – Third Democratic forum is held in Des Moines, Iowa
 January 14 – The sixth Republican debate is held in North Charleston, South Carolina
 January 17 – The fourth Democratic debate is held in Charleston, South Carolina
 January 25 – A Democratic forum, a town hall event, is held in Des Moines, Iowa
 January 28 – Seventh Republican debate is held in Des Moines, Iowa

February 2016 
 February 1
 The Iowa Democratic caucus is won by Hillary Clinton
 The Iowa Republican caucus is won by Ted Cruz
 Martin O'Malley formally withdraws his candidacy for the Democratic presidential nomination
 Mike Huckabee formally withdraws his candidacy for the Republican presidential nomination
 February 3
 Rand Paul formally withdraws his candidacy for the Republican presidential nomination
 Rick Santorum formally withdraws his candidacy for the Republican presidential nomination
 A  Democratic Town Hall forum event is held in Derry, New Hampshire
 February 4 – Fifth Democratic debate is held in Durham, New Hampshire
 February 6 – Eighth Republican debate is held in Manchester, New Hampshire
 February 9
 The  New Hampshire Republican primary is won by Donald Trump
 The  New Hampshire Democratic primary is won by Bernie Sanders
 February 10
 Chris Christie formally withdraws his candidacy for the Republican presidential nomination
 Carly Fiorina formally withdraws her candidacy for the Republican presidential nomination
 February 11 – Sixth Democratic debate is held in Milwaukee, Wisconsin
 February 12 – Jim Gilmore formally withdraws his candidacy for the Republican presidential nomination
 February 13 – Ninth Republican debate is held in Charleston, South Carolina
 February 17–18 – CNN Republican town halls are held in Greenville, South Carolina and Columbia, South Carolina
 February 18 – Democratic Town Hall forum event is held in Las Vegas, Nevada
 February 20
 Nevada Democratic caucuses are won by Hillary Clinton
 South Carolina Republican primary is won by Donald Trump
 Jeb Bush formally withdraws his candidacy for the Republican presidential nomination
 February 23
 Nevada Republican caucuses are won by Donald Trump
 CNN Democratic town hall is held in Columbia, South Carolina
 February 24 – Republican town hall is held in Houston, Texas
 February 25 – 10th Republican debate is held in Houston, Texas
 February 27 – South Carolina Democratic primary is won by Hillary Clinton

March 2016 
 March 1 – Super Tuesday
 Democratic primaries/caucuses:
 Alabama Democratic primary won by Hillary Clinton
 Arkansas Democratic primary won by Hillary Clinton
 Colorado Democratic caucus won by Bernie Sanders
 Georgia Democratic primary won by Hillary Clinton
 Massachusetts Democratic primary won by Hillary Clinton
 Minnesota Democratic caucus won by Bernie Sanders
 Oklahoma Democratic primary won by Bernie Sanders
 Tennessee Democratic primary won by Hillary Clinton
 Texas Democratic primary won by Hillary Clinton
 Vermont Democratic primary won by Bernie Sanders
 Virginia Democratic primary won by Hillary Clinton
 Republican primaries/caucuses:
 Alabama Republican primary won by Donald Trump
 Alaska Republican caucus won by Ted Cruz
 Arkansas Republican primary won by Donald Trump
 Georgia Republican primary won by Donald Trump
 Massachusetts Republican primary won by Donald Trump
 Minnesota Republican caucus won by Marco Rubio
 Oklahoma Republican primary won by Ted Cruz
 Tennessee Republican primary won by Donald Trump
 Texas Republican primary won by Ted Cruz
 Vermont Republican primary won by Donald Trump
 Virginia Republican primary won by Donald Trump
 March 3 – Eleventh Republican debate is held in Detroit, Michigan
 March 4 – Ben Carson formally withdraws his candidacy for the Republican presidential nomination
 March 5
 Democratic primaries/caucuses:
 Kansas Democratic caucus won by Bernie Sanders
 Louisiana Democratic primary won by Hillary Clinton
 Nebraska Democratic caucus won by Bernie Sanders
 Republican primaries/caucuses:
 Kansas Republican caucus won by Ted Cruz
 Kentucky Republican caucus won by Donald Trump
 Louisiana Republican primary won by Donald Trump
 Maine Republican caucus won by Ted Cruz
 March 6
 Maine Democratic caucus won by Bernie Sanders
 Puerto Rico Republican primary won by Marco Rubio
 Seventh Democratic debate is held in Flint, Michigan
 March 8
 Democratic primaries/caucuses:
 Democratic Michigan primary won by Bernie Sanders
 Democratic Mississippi primary won by Hillary Clinton
 Republican primaries/caucuses:
 Republican Michigan primary won by Donald Trump
 Republican Mississippi primary won by Donald Trump
 Hawaii Republican caucus won by Donald Trump
 Idaho Republican primary won by Ted Cruz
 March 9 – Eighth and final Democratic debate is held in Miami, Florida
 March 10
 Twelfth Republican debate is held in Miami, Florida
 Virgin Islands Republican caucus won by Ted Cruz
 March 12
 Democratic primaries/caucuses:
 Northern Marianas Democratic caucus won by Hillary Clinton
 Republican primaries/caucuses:
 Washington D.C. Republican caucus won by Marco Rubio
 Wyoming Republicans' county conventions are won by Ted Cruz
 Guam Republican caucus is held. Ted Cruz is awarded one delegate. The remaining eight delegates are uncommitted, pending a future meeting
 March 15
 Democratic primaries/caucuses:
 Florida Democratic primary won by Hillary Clinton
 Illinois Democratic primary won by Hillary Clinton
 Missouri Democratic primary won by Hillary Clinton
 North Carolina Democratic primary won by Hillary Clinton
 Ohio Democratic primary won by Hillary Clinton
 Republican primaries/caucuses:
 Florida Republican primary won by Donald Trump
 Illinois Republican primary won by Donald Trump
 Missouri Republican primary won by Donald Trump
 North Carolina Republican primary won by Donald Trump
 Ohio Republican primary won by John Kasich
 Northern Marianas Republican caucus won by Donald Trump
 Marco Rubio formally withdraws his candidacy for the Republican presidential nomination
 March 21
 Democrats Abroad primary won by Bernie Sanders
 March 22
 Democratic primaries/caucuses:
 Arizona Democratic primary won by Hillary Clinton
 Idaho Democratic caucus won by Bernie Sanders
 Utah Democratic caucus won by Bernie Sanders
 Republican primaries/caucuses:
 Arizona Republican primary won by Donald Trump
 Utah Republican caucus won by Ted Cruz
 American Samoa Republican caucus is held; Ted Cruz and Donald Trump respectively secure one delegate each, majority of delegates remain uncommitted.
 March 26
 Democratic caucuses:
 Washington Democratic caucus won by Bernie Sanders
 Alaska Democratic caucus won by Bernie Sanders
 Hawaii Democratic caucus won by Bernie Sanders
 March 29 – Republican town hall

April 2016 
 April 1 – First ever nationally televised Libertarian presidential debate hosted by John Stossel airs on Fox Business Network (Part 1)
 April 2 – Delegate count at the North Dakota Republican State Convention is won by Ted Cruz
 April 5
 Wisconsin Democratic primary won by Bernie Sanders
 Wisconsin Republican primary won by Ted Cruz
 April 8 – Part 2 of first ever nationally televised Libertarian presidential debate hosted by John Stossel airs on Fox Business Network
 April 9 – Delegate count of the Colorado Republican convention is won by Ted Cruz
 April 9 – Wyoming Democratic caucus won by Bernie Sanders
 April 14 – Ninth Democratic debate is held in Brooklyn, New York
 April 19
 New York Democratic primary won by Hillary Clinton
 New York Republican primary won by Donald Trump
 April 26
 Democratic primaries/caucuses:
 Connecticut Democratic primary won by Hillary Clinton
 Delaware Democratic primary won by Hillary Clinton
 Maryland Democratic primary won by Hillary Clinton
 Pennsylvania Democratic primary won by Hillary Clinton
 Rhode Island Democratic primary won by Bernie Sanders
 Republican primaries/caucuses:
 Connecticut Republican primary won by Donald Trump
 Delaware Republican primary won by Donald Trump
 Maryland Republican primary won by Donald Trump
 Pennsylvania Republican primary won by Donald Trump
 Rhode Island Republican primary won by Donald Trump

May 2016 
 May 3
 Indiana Democratic primary won by Bernie Sanders
 Indiana Republican primary won by Donald Trump
 Ted Cruz formally withdraws his candidacy for the Republican presidential nomination
 May 4 – John Kasich formally withdraws his candidacy for the Republican presidential nomination
 May 7 – Guam Democratic caucuses won by Hillary Clinton
 May 10
 Democratic primaries/caucuses:
 West Virginia Democratic primary won by Bernie Sanders
 Republican primaries/caucuses:
 West Virginia Republican primary won by Donald Trump
 Nebraska Republican primary won by Donald Trump
 May 12 – Second nationally televised Libertarian presidential debate airs on RT America.
 May 17
 Democratic primaries/caucuses:
 Kentucky Democratic primary won by Hillary Clinton
 Oregon Democratic primary won by Bernie Sanders
 Republican primaries/caucuses:
 Oregon Republican primary won by Donald Trump
 Gary Johnson announces he has chosen former Massachusetts governor William Weld as his vice presidential running mate
 May 20 – Third nationally televised Libertarian presidential debate airs on TheBlaze.
 May 24 – Washington Republican primary won by Donald Trump
 May 26–30 – The Libertarian National Convention is held in Orlando, Florida. Gary Johnson is chosen as the party's presidential nominee and William Weld is chosen as the party's vice presidential nominee
 May 26 – Donald Trump officially passes 1,237 pledged delegates, the minimum amount of delegates required to secure the 2016 Republican presidential nomination

June 2016 
 June 4 – Virgin Islands Democratic caucuses won by Hillary Clinton
 June 5 – Puerto Rico Democratic caucuses won by Hillary Clinton
 June 6 – Former Secretary of State Hillary Clinton officially passes 2,383 pledged delegates, the minimum amount of delegates required to secure the 2016 Democratic presidential nomination.
 June 7
 Democratic primaries/caucuses
 California Democratic primary won by Hillary Clinton
 Montana Democratic primary won by Bernie Sanders
 New Jersey Democratic primary won by Hillary Clinton
 New Mexico Democratic primary won by Hillary Clinton
 North Dakota Democratic caucus won by Bernie Sanders
 South Dakota  Democratic primary won by Hillary Clinton
 Republican primaries/caucuses
 California Republican primary won by Donald Trump
 Montana Republican primary won by Donald Trump
 New Jersey Republican primary won by Donald Trump
 New Mexico Republican primary won by Donald Trump
 South Dakota Republican primary won by Donald Trump
 June 9
 President Barack Obama officially endorses Hillary Clinton
 At Trump Tower, Donald Trump, Jr., Paul Manafort and Jared Kushner meet with a Russian lawyer who has promised to provide material embarrassing to Hillary Clinton.
 June 14 – Washington, D.C. Democratic primary won by Hillary Clinton
 June 15 – Jill Stein reaches the necessary number of delegates for the Green nomination and becomes presumptive nominee
 June 22 – Libertarian presidential town hall hosted and aired by CNN

July 2016 
 July 12 – Bernie Sanders endorses Hillary Clinton
 July 15 – Republican presumptive nominee Donald Trump announces Indiana governor Mike Pence as his vice presidential running mate
 July 18–21 – Republican National Convention is held in Cleveland, Ohio. Donald Trump and Mike Pence are formally nominated for President and Vice President, respectively, by the party's state delegations
 July 21 – Donald Trump formally accepts the Republican nomination
 July 22 – Democratic presumptive nominee Hillary Clinton announces United States Senator and former Virginian governor Tim Kaine as her vice presidential running mate
 July 23 – Wikileaks leaks 20,000 emails from the Democratic National Committee, revealing a systematic bias against Bernie Sanders from the Democratic Party leadership, leading to the resignation of DNC chair Debbie Wasserman Schultz
 July 25–28 – Democratic National Convention is held in Philadelphia, Pennsylvania. Hillary Clinton and Tim Kaine are formally nominated for President and Vice President, respectively, by the party's state delegations
 July 28 – Hillary Clinton accepts the nomination from the Democratic Party, becoming the first female presidential nominee of a major party in U.S. history.

August 2016 
 August 1 – Green Party presumptive nominee Jill Stein announces Human rights activist Ajamu Baraka as her vice presidential running mate
 August 4–7 – Green National Convention is held in Houston, Texas. Jill Stein is chosen as the party's presidential nominee and Ajamu Baraka is chosen as the party's vice presidential nominee
 August 8 – Former chief policy director for the House Republican Conference and former CIA operations officer Evan McMullin formally announces his presidential candidacy as an independent

September 2016 
 September 7 – Arrest warrants are issued for Green Party presidential candidate Jill Stein and running mate Ajamu Baraka for trespass and vandalism during a North Dakota protest.
 September 26 – First presidential general election debate between the two major candidates was held at Hofstra University in Hempstead, New York. (The first debate was originally going to be held at Wright State University, but the location was changed due to rising security costs that were being incurred by the school.) Hillary Clinton ends up taking the majority support after the debate.

October 2016 

 October 4 – Only vice presidential general election debate was held at Longwood University in Farmville, Virginia. Mike Pence (Trump's running mate) ends up narrowly winning favor over Tim Kaine (Clinton's running mate).
 October 7
 Tapes are leaked out from Access Hollywood showing Donald Trump and Billy Bush bragging about sexual exploits in 2005.
 WikiLeaks begins publishing thousands of emails from the personal Gmail account of Clinton campaign manager John Podesta, revealing excerpts from Clinton's paid speeches to Wall Street.
 October 9 – Second presidential general election debate was held at Washington University in St. Louis in St. Louis, Missouri. Hillary Clinton ends up narrowly winning over Donald Trump.
 October 19 – The third and final presidential debate between the two major candidates was held at the University of Nevada, Las Vegas in Paradise, Nevada Hillary Clinton ends up winning with a very close margin over Donald Trump.
 October 25 – The Free & Equal Election Foundation debate was held at the University of Colorado in Boulder, Colorado, allowing all candidates with major ballot access to participate. Gary Johnson publicly declined the offer.
 October 28 – James Comey announces that the FBI will be investigating newly discovered emails pertinent to its previous investigation of Hillary Clinton's private server. Hillary's lead in the polls drops heavily within days.
 October 31 – PBS airs the first part of a presidential forum with major third-party candidates Gary Johnson and Jill Stein, moderated by Tavis Smiley.

November 2016 
 November 6 – James Comey tells Congress there is no evidence in the recently discovered emails that Clinton should face charges over handling of classified information
 November 8 – US Election Day.
 A shooting at a residential area near a polling place in Azusa, California, leaves one dead and three injured and some polling places in the city locked down.
 Pre-6 p.m
 12:30 a.m: Polls close in Dixville Notch, New Hampshire. The vote is 4 for Clinton, 2 for Trump.
 Approximately 1:30a.m: In the Guam straw poll, which has historically predicted the election winner, Clinton defeats Trump by approximately three to one.
 6 a.m. to 12p.m: Polls open throughout the country, with the last being Hawaii, which opens up 12p.m. EST (7a.m. AHST).
 8 a.m: Hillary Clinton votes in Chappaqua, New York.
 11 a.m: Donald Trump votes in New York City.
 6 p.m
 The Eastern Time zone sections of Indiana and Kentucky close their polls.
 7 p.m
 The Eastern Time zone of Florida close their polls.
Georgia, South Carolina, Virginia, Vermont, and most places in New Hampshire close their polls.
 7:30 p.m
 Ohio, West Virginia, and North Carolina close their polls.
 8 p.m
 The latest time to close the polls in New Hampshire.
 The Eastern Time zone of Michigan close their polls.
 The Central Time zone of Florida, Texas, Kansas, South Dakota, and North Dakota close their polls.
 Oklahoma, Missouri, Illinois, Tennessee, Mississippi, Alabama, Pennsylvania, Maryland, District of Columbia, Delaware, New Jersey, Connecticut, Rhode Island, Massachusetts, and Maine close their polls.
 8:30 p.m
 Arkansas closes their polls.
 9 p.m
 The Central Time zone of Michigan close their polls.
 The Mountain Time zones of Texas, Kansas, South Dakota, and North Dakota close their polls.
 Arizona, Colorado, Louisiana, Minnesota, Nebraska, New Mexico, New York, Wisconsin, and Wyoming close their polls.
 10 p.m
 The Mountain Time zones of Oregon and Idaho close their polls.
 Nevada, Utah, Montana, Iowa close their polls.
 11 p.m
 The Pacific Time zones of Oregon and Idaho close their polls.
 California, Hawaii, and Washington close their polls.
 November 9
 12 a.m
 Alaska closes its polls.
 2:45 a.m. Eastern time
 Donald Trump is the projected winner of the election, becoming president-elect.
Morningtime
The 2016 Portland, Oregon riots begin
The 2016 Oakland riots begin
Protests begin in numerous other cities
 November 23 – Jill Stein starts fundraising for a recount effort in Michigan, Pennsylvania, and Wisconsin.

December 2016 
 December 19 – The electors of the Electoral College meet in their respective capitals and formally cast their ballots. Trump receives 304 electoral votes, Clinton receives 227. Seven faithless electors cast their votes for other candidates.

2017

January 2017 
 January 6 – Electoral votes formally counted before a joint session of Congress; the President of the Senate Joe Biden formally announces the electoral result.
 January 20 – Inauguration of Donald Trump as the 45th president of the United States and Mike Pence as the 48th vice president.

Election results by state 

★Two states (Maine and Nebraska) allow for their electoral votes to be split between candidates. The winner within each congressional district gets one electoral vote for the district. The winner of the statewide vote gets two additional electoral votes.
Results are from the Associated Press.

Election campaign 2016 candidate participation timeline
Candidate announcement and, if applicable, withdrawal dates are as follows:

See also 
 2004 United States presidential election timeline
 2008 United States presidential election timeline
 2012 United States presidential election timeline
 Democratic Party presidential primaries, 2016
 Republican Party presidential primaries, 2016
 Libertarian Party presidential primaries, 2016
 Green Party presidential primaries, 2016
 Timeline of the presidency of Donald Trump

References

External links
 
 2016 Presidential Form 2 Filers at the Federal Election Commission (FEC)

Timeline
2016
Articles which contain graphical timelines